The Pegasus-class hydrofoils were a series of fast attack patrol boats employed by the United States Navy. They were in service from 1977 until 1993. These hydrofoils carried the designation "PHM" for "Patrol Hydrofoil, Missile." The Pegasus-class vessels were originally intended for NATO operations in the North Sea and Baltic Sea. Subsequently, participation by other NATO navies, including Germany and Italy, ceased and the U.S. Navy proceeded to procure six PHMs, which were highly successful in conducting coastal operations, such as narcotics interdiction and coastal patrol, in the Caribbean basin.

History
In 1970 Admiral Elmo Zumwalt, the new Chief of Naval Operations (CNO), keen to increase the Navy's number of surface vessels in a cost-effective manner, committed the United States to the NATO program for a hydrofoil. The U.S. Navy proposed the PHM design as a NATO standard, with the program being led by the U.S. Navy, and an order placed for two prototypes in 1972. The Italian Navy and the West German Bundesmarine signed letters of intent to participate in the programme, with other NATO navies, including the Royal Navy and Canadian Forces studying the project. The U.S. Navy planned to buy up to 30 PHMs, with 10 to be purchased by West Germany and four by Italy.

After Zumwalt's retirement, the Navy chose to funnel most of the money for the PHMs into larger vessels. This delayed the ongoing construction of Pegasus, and the other vessels were not started. Congress eventually forced the Navy to complete the vessels. The difficulties in project progression forced the other involved navies to abort their participation.

Pegasus ships were well armed for their size, carrying two four-rack RGM-84 Harpoon anti-ship missiles and an Oto Melara 76 mm gun. The West German version would have carried the MM38 Exocet.

As Pegasus was constructed several years before the rest of the series, there are some slight differences, such as the fire-control system.

All six vessels were constructed by Boeing, in Seattle at the Renton plant at the south end of Lake Washington. They were stationed at NAS Key West. Principal contractors, along with Boeing, were Sperry Corporation for MK 92 Mod 1 fire control system, Hollandse Signaalapparaten and Sperry Corp. (under license) for WM 28 fire control system, OTO-Melara for 76 mm gun, and NAVSEC for design support.

It was judged to be more advanced than the Grumman  which was built at the same time to the same requirements. The primary technology, also used in the Boeing Jetfoil ferries, used submerged flying foils with waterjet propulsion.

The ships were retired because they were not judged cost effective for their mission in a Navy with primarily offensive missions rather than coastal patrol. All other PHMs in the class were sold for scrap. In the early 2000s Gemini was converted into a yacht, but was abandoned by its owners in the 2010s and scrapped in 2017.

List of ships
  (9 July 1977 – 30 July 1993), formerly Delphinus
  (18 December 1982 – 30 July 1993)
  (10 October 1981 – 30 July 1993)
  (26 June 1982 – 30 July 1993)
  (18 September 1982 – 30 July 1993)
  (13 November 1982 – 30 July 1993)

See also
 Boeing hydrofoils
 
 
 , a Canadian hydrofoil intended for anti-submarine duties
 , a Royal Navy Jetfoil mine countermeasure vessel.
 Matka-class missile boat, a class of Soviet PHM
 Sarancha-class missile boat, a class of Soviet PHM
 , a class of Italian PHM
 PHM Pegasus, a videogame based on this class of vessels

References

 Gardiner, Robert and Stephen Chumbley. Conway's All The World's Fighting Ships 1947–1995. Annapolis, Maryland, USA: Naval Institute Press, 1995. .
 McLeavy, Roy. Jane's Surface Skimmers: Hovercraft and Hydrofoils 1975–76. Jane's Yearbooks, 1975. .
 Jenkins, George. "Patrol Combatant Missile (Hydrofoil): PHM History 1973–1995" (pdf).  Foils.com, 1 November 2000. Retrieved 5 September 2012.

External links

 Boeing page
 USS Aries PHM-5 Hydrofoil Memorial, Inc. - Brunswick, Missouri

 
Missile boat classes